Donald Joseph Vicic (born 1935) was a Canadian football player who played for the BC Lions. He won the Grey Cup with them in 1964. He played college football at Ohio State University. He was later an investment advisor and founded Brown & Vicic Limited. He is currently a vice-president and consultant to RBC Dominion Securities.

References

External links

1935 births
BC Lions players
Players of American football from Ohio
Living people